Clappertown is an unincorporated community and census-designated place (CDP) in Blair County, Pennsylvania, United States. It was first listed as a CDP prior to the 2020 census.

The CDP is in eastern Blair County, in the northwestern part of Huston Township. It is in the Morrisons Cove region of the county, in the valley of Piney Creek, which flows north to the Frankstown Branch of the Juniata River at Ganister, part of the Susquehanna River watershed. Lock Mountain rises to an elevation of  just west of Clappertown.

Pennsylvania Route 866 passes through the community, leading northeast  to Wiliamsburg on the Frankstown Branch, and south-southeast  to Martinsburg.

Demographics

References 

Census-designated places in Blair County, Pennsylvania
Census-designated places in Pennsylvania